Chroniosaurus is an extinct genus of chroniosuchid reptiliomorph from upper Permian (upper Tatarian age) deposits of Novgorod, Orenburg and Vologda Regions, Russia. It was first named by Tverdokhlebova in 1972 and the type species is Chroniosaurus dongusensis.

References 

Chroniosuchians
Permian tetrapods
Fossils of Russia